Hanadi Sleiman is a Canadian chemist who is Canada Research Chair in DNA Nanoscience at McGill University. Her research makes use of DNA as a template for nanomaterials. She was awarded the Natural Sciences and Engineering Research Council Polanyi Award in 2021.

Early life and education 

Sleiman was an undergraduate and doctoral researcher at Stanford University, where she studied tungsten nitrenes. At Stanford, she attended a lecture by Jean-Marie Lehn who discussed supramolecular chemistry. After earning her doctorate, she moved to the Louis Pasteur University as a French National Centre for Scientific Research (CNRS) Fellow, where she worked alongside Jean-Marie Lehn.

Research and career 
In 1999, Sleiman joined the faculty at McGill University, where she started using DNA to assemble nanomaterials. In particular she is interested in DNA structures that can target cancer cells and make them respond to chemotherapy. She has designed tuneable DNA cages and nanotubes that can encapsulate and selectively release pharmaceuticals when they encounter a biological stimulus. These non toxic cages can facilitate personalised drug delivery, that is, healthcare that is based on a person's genetics, environment or lifestyle. They can rapidly enter mammalian cells, turning on and off gene expression and modulating their behaviour. Sleiman has proposed that nucleic acids will enable precision oncology.

Sleiman has shown that it is possible to chemically imprint polymer particles with DNA strands for soft robotics. She joined the Society for the Advancement of Science and Technology in the Arab World in 2011.

Awards and honours 
 2004 McGill Dawson Award 
 2009 Canadian Society for Chemistry Strem Award 
 2012 Swiss Chemical Society Lectureship
 2016 Izatt-Christensen Award in Supramolecular Chemistry
 2018 Netherlands Scholar Award in Supramolecular Chemistry
 2018 Killam Research Fellowship 
 2018 Albus Award 
 2021 Natural Sciences and Engineering Research Council Polanyi Award
 2021 Cottrell STAR Award
 2022 Columbia University BMS Lecture

Selected publications

References 

Year of birth missing (living people)
Living people
Canadian women chemists
20th-century Canadian chemists
20th-century Canadian women scientists
21st-century Canadian chemists
21st-century Canadian women scientists
Stanford University alumni
Academic staff of McGill University
French National Centre for Scientific Research scientists
Canada Research Chairs